Marcantonio Bragadin or Marco Antonio Bragadin may refer to:
 Marco Antonio Bragadin (1523–1571), Venetian lawyer and military officer
 Marcantonio Bragadin (cardinal) (1591–1658), Venetian cardinal who served as Bishop of Vicenza
 Marcantonio Bragadin (admiral) (1906–1986), Italian admiral and screenwriter of a number of war films